Anh Do (born 2 June 1977) is a Vietnamese-born Australian author, actor, comedian, and painter.
He has appeared on Australian TV shows such as Thank God You're Here and Good News Week, and was runner-up on Dancing with the Stars in 2007. He studied a combined Business Law degree at the University of Technology, Sydney. He is the brother of film director Khoa Do and has acted in several of Khoa's films, including Footy Legends, which he co-wrote and produced. In 2012, his TV show Anh Does Vietnam began airing. He has been four times a finalist in the Archibald Prize and won the 2017 People's Choice Award. From 2016 to 2021, Do hosted Anh's Brush with Fame on ABC TV in which he concurrently interviews and paints a portrait of prominent Australians.

Biography

Refugee
Anh Do and his family fled to Australia as refugees in 1980. In his 2010 autobiography, The Happiest Refugee, Do tells of how his family survived five days in a leaky fishing boat nine and a half metres long and two metres wide. During the trip his family and the rest of the passengers were attacked by two different bands of pirates. The first group stole one of the two engines and the second group of pirates stole the second engine, which had been broken but repaired by Do's father using a piece of rubber from a  thong. It was reported that as the second band of pirates left, one of them threw a gallon of water onboard which kept all but one of the refugees alive, until they were finally rescued by a German merchant ship. The boat was packed with 40 Vietnamese refugees fleeing across the Indian Ocean. "We were crammed in like sardines," he said. Do's family settled in the Sydney suburb of Yagoona.

The Happiest Refugee has won awards, including the 2011 Australian Book of the Year, Biography of the Year and Newcomer of the Year, as well as the Indie Book of the Year Award 2011, Non-fiction Indie Book of the Year 2011, and it was shortlisted for the 2011 NSW Premier's Literary Awards, Community Relations Commission Award.

Career

Do attended St Aloysius' College in Milsons Point for his secondary education. When he was 14 he started a small business breeding tropical fish. While studying his first year of law at the University of Technology, Sydney, he owned a stall which sold American Indian artifacts, which he later expanded to four franchised stores. Six months before finishing his combined Business Law degree, law firms offered him jobs which required 60 hours of work a week. He opted to take up stand-up comedy instead. Since 2013 Do has cut back on comedy to focus on painting full-time. He was a finalist in the Archibald Prize in 2014, 2017 and 2019.

From 2016 to 2021, Do hosted Anh's Brush with Fame on ABC-TV. In this popular program, Anh Do concurrently interviews and paints a portrait of prominent Australians. He has been criticised for pre-painting the portraits from photographs and enlisting help from his art tutor.

Personal life
Do is married to Suzanne (Suzie) Do and they have three sons and a daughter. Do met Suzie whilst they were both studying at university. His mother, Hien, played the role of Van Nguyen's mother, Kim, in Better Man, a film which was produced by Anh's brother Khoa Do.

Awards
 2011 Independent Booksellers Book of the Year (for The Happiest Refugee)
 2011 Joint winner (with musician Paul Kelly) of the Biography of the Year (for The Happiest Refugee)
 2011 Best Newcomer (for The Happiest Refugee)
 2011 Book of the Year (for The Happiest Refugee)
 2017 People's Choice Award, Archibald Prize (for portrait of Jack Charles)

Mo Awards
The Australian Entertainment Mo Awards (commonly known informally as the Mo Awards), were annual Australian entertainment industry awards. They recognise achievements in live entertainment in Australia from 1975 to 2016. Anh Do won one award in that time.
 (wins only)
|-
| 2012
| Anh Do
| Rodney Rude Stand Up Comedian of the Year
| 
|-

Acting filmography
 Double the Fist (2008) as Krakbot
 Crooked Business (2008) as Benny Wing
 Kick (2007) as Hoa Tran
 Footy Legends (2006) as Luc Vu
 Solo (2006) as Nguyen
 Pizza as Chong Fat (2005–2007)
 Blue Water High – (Episode: It's Hard to Be Normal) (2005) as Robbo
 Little Fish (2005) as Tran
 The Finished People (2003) as Factory Worker
 All Saints (2003) (Episode: The Devil to Pay) as Tim Salter
 Don't Blame Me (2002) as Vinnie
 SeaChange (2000) as Quan Tho

Filmography (as himself)
 Anh's Brush with Fame (2016–2021) as host
 Anh Does Brazil (2014) as host
 Anh Does Iceland (2014) as host
 Anh Does Scandinavia (2014) as host
 Anh Does Britain (2013) as host
 Anh Does Vietnam, (2012) as host
 Talking Heads (2010, Series 6 Episode 33) guest
 Top Gear Australia (2009) as guest
 The Squiz (2009) as host
 Made in China (2008) as host
 Short and Curly as host
 Deal or No Deal Special (2007) as Contestant (Won maximum prize of $200,000)
 Dancing with the Stars (2007) as contestant
 Thank God You're Here (2006 & 2007) as contestant
 The NRL Footy Show, comedian
 Matty Johns Show as himself in segment Anh Can Do
 Pictures of You, as guest
 Long Lost Family as co-host

Books
 The Happiest Refugee (2010)
 The Little Refugee  (with Bruce Whatley) (2011)
 WeirDo (2013)
 WeirDo #2 : Even Weirder! (2014)
 WeirDo #3 : Extra Weird (2014)
 WeirDo #4: Super Weird! (2015) 
 WeirDo #5 : Totally Weird! (2015)
 WeirDo #6 : Crazy Weird! (2016)
 WeirDo #7 : Mega Weird! (2016)
 Hot Dog! (Hot Dog #1) (2016)
 What Do They do with all the Poo from all the Animals at the Zoo? (2016)
 WeirDo #8 : Really Weird! (2017)
 WeirDo #9 : Spooky Weird! (2017)
 Hot Dog! Party Time (Hotdog, #2) (2017)
 WeirDo #10 : Messy Weird! (2018)
 Ninja Kid (2018)
 WeirDo #11: Splashy Weird! (2018)
Rise of the Mythix : Golden Unicorn (2019)
 WeirDo #12: Hopping Weird! (2019)
 WeirDo #13: Weirdomania! (2019)
 Wolf Girl: Into the Wild (2019)
 The Great Escape: Wolf Girl 2 (2019)
 WeirDo #14: Vote Weirdo (2020)
 Rise of the Mythix: Might Minotaur (2020)
 WeirDo #15: Planet Weird (2020)
 The Secret Cave: Wolf Girl 3 (2020)
The Traitor: Wolf Girl 4 (2020)
 Rise of the Mythix: Flight of the Griffin (2021)
 WeirDo #16: Tasty Weird! (2021)
 Weirdo #17: Spinning Weird (2021)
 Rise of the Mythix: Legends Unite (2021)
 Across the Sea: Wolf Girl 5 (2021)
 Animal Train: Wolf Girl 6 (2021)
 Weirdo #18: Weird History! (2022) 
 Rise of the Mythix: The Last Gladiator (2022)
Crash Course: Wolf Girl 7 (2022)
''Welcome to Paradise: Wolf Girl 8 (2022)

References

External links
 
 

1977 births
Living people
Male actors from Sydney
Vietnamese emigrants to Australia
Australian male film actors
Australian male comedians
Australian stand-up comedians
Australian male television actors
Australian television presenters
People educated at St Aloysius' College (Sydney)
University of Technology Sydney Law School alumni
Vietnamese refugees
Australian autobiographers
Australian jurists
Australian painters
21st-century Australian male actors